Gwon Han-Na (born 22 November 1989) is a South Korean handball player for Busan and the South Korean national team.

She competed for the South Korean team at the 2012 Summer Olympics in London.

References

External links

South Korean female handball players
1989 births
Living people
Handball players at the 2012 Summer Olympics
Handball players at the 2016 Summer Olympics
Olympic handball players of South Korea
Asian Games medalists in handball
Handball players at the 2014 Asian Games
Asian Games gold medalists for South Korea
Universiade medalists in handball
Medalists at the 2014 Asian Games
Handball players from Seoul
Universiade silver medalists for South Korea
Medalists at the 2015 Summer Universiade